The Southwestern Paman languages are a family of the Paman languages spoken on the western part of the Cape York Peninsula of Queensland, Australia.

Alpher (1972) accepts Southwestern Pama as a valid node; the classification below is his. R. M. W. Dixon, on the other hand, only accepts a connections between pairs of languages: Yir, as two dialects of a single language, and Koko Bera with Kok Thawa.

 Upper Southwest Pama
 Kuuk Thaayorre
 Kuuk Yak
 Kunjen (Oykangand) / Ogh-Undjan (Kawarrangg)
 Coastal Southwest Pama
 Yir-Yoront (Yirrk-Thangalkl)
 Koko Pera: Koko-Bera, Kok Thawa

Bowern (2011) also lists the extinct Kokiny and Kok-Papángk.

References 

 
Indigenous Australian languages in Queensland